The following elections are scheduled to occur in 2018. The National Democratic Institute also maintains a calendar of elections around the world.

Africa
2018 Djiboutian parliamentary election 23 February 2018
2018 Sierra Leonean general election 7 and 31 March 2018
2018 Egyptian presidential election 26–28 March 2018
2018 Tunisian local elections 6 May 2018
2018 Réunion's 7th constituency by-election to the French national assembly 6 July 2018
2018 Malian presidential election 29 July 2018
2018 Zimbabwean general election 30 July 2018
2018 Swazi general election 18 August and 21 September 2018
2018 Rwandan parliamentary election 3 September 2018
2018 Mauritanian parliamentary election 1 and 15 September 2018
2018 Gabonese legislative election 6 and 27 October 2018
2018 Cameroonian presidential election 7 October 2018
2018 São Toméan legislative election 7 October 2018
2018 Malagasy presidential election 7 November and 19 December 2018
2018 Togolese parliamentary election 20 December 2018
Democratic Republic of the Congo general election, 2018 30 December 2018

Asia
 India:
2018 Indian Rajya Sabha elections 16 January, 23 March, and 21 June 2018
2018 Tripura Legislative Assembly election 18 February 2018
2018 Meghalaya Legislative Assembly election 27 February 2018
2018 Nagaland Legislative Assembly election 27 February 2018
2018 Karnataka Legislative Assembly election 12 May, 28 May, and 11 June 2018
2018 Chhattisgarh Legislative Assembly election 12 and 20 November 2018
2018 Mizoram Legislative Assembly election 28 November 2018
2018 Madhya Pradesh Legislative Assembly election 28 November 2018
2018 Rajasthan Legislative Assembly election 7 December 2018
Nepalese National Assembly election, 2018 7 February 2018
 Pakistan:
2018 Pakistani Senate election 3 March 2018
2018 Pakistani general election 25 July 2018
2018 Balochistan provincial election 25 July 2018
2018 Khyber Pakhtunkhwa provincial election 25 July 2018
2018 Punjab provincial election 25 July 2018
2018 Sindh provincial election 25 July 2018
2018 Pakistani presidential election 4 September 2018
2018 Nepalese presidential election 13 March 2018
2018 Turkmen parliamentary election 25 March 2018
2018 Bhutanese National Council election 20 April 2018
2018 Malaysian general election 9 May 2018
2018 South Korean local elections 13 June 2018
2018 Turkish general election 24 June 2018
2018 Indonesian local elections 27 June 2018
2018 Cambodian general election 29 July 2018
2018 Bhutanese National Assembly election 15 September and 18 October 2018
2018 Maldivian presidential election 23 September 2018
2018 Afghan parliamentary election 20 October 2018
2018 Taiwanese local elections 24 November 2018
 2018 Bangladeshi general election 30 December 2018

Middle East
2018 Lebanese general election 6 May 2018
2018 Iraqi parliamentary election 12 May 2018
2018 Kurdistan Region parliamentary election 20 October 2018
2018 Israeli municipal elections 30 October 2018 and 13 November 2018
Bahraini general election, 2018 24 November and 1 December 2018

Europe
 Czech Republic 
2018 Trutnov by-election 5-6 and 12–13 January 2018
2018 Czech presidential election 12–13 January 2018 and 26–27 January 2018
2018 Zlín by-election 18 and 19 May 2018 and 25 and 26 May 2018
2018 Czech municipal elections 5 and 6 October 2018
2018 Czech Senate election 5 and 6 October 2018
2018 Cypriot presidential election 28 January and 4 February 2018
2018 Finnish presidential election 28 January 2018
 France 
2018 Val-d'Oise's 1st constituency by-election 28 January and 4 February 2018
2018 Territoire de Belfort's 1st constituency by-election 28 January and 4 February 2018
2016-18 Montenegrin municipal elections 4 February and 20–27 May 2018
2018 Haute-Garonne's 8th constituency by-election 11 March and 18 March 2018
2018 Loiret's 4th constituency by-election 18 March and 25 March 2018 
2018 Mayotte's 1st constituency by-election 18 March and 25 March 2018
2018 Essonne's 1st constituency by-election 18 November and 25 November 2018
2018 Monegasque general election 11 February 2018
2018 Armenian presidential election 2 March 2018
2018 Italian general election 4 March 2018
2018 Russian elections
2018 Russian presidential election 18 March 2018
By-elections to the State Duma 9 September 2018
2018 Russian gubernatorial elections 9 September- 16 December 2018
2018 Russian regional elections 9, 16, and 23 September 2018
2018 Dutch municipal elections 21 March 2018
2018 Hungarian parliamentary election 8 April 2018
2018 Azerbaijani presidential election 11 April 2018
2018 Montenegrin presidential election 15 April 2018
2018 United Kingdom local elections 3 May 2018
2018 Icelandic municipal elections 26 May 2018
2018 Slovenian parliamentary election 3 June 2018
2018 Turkish general election 24 June 2018
2018 Swedish general election 9 September 2018
2018 Macedonian referendum 30 September 2018
2018 Latvian parliamentary election 6 October 2018
2018 Bosnian general election 7 October 2018
2018 Belgian local elections 14 October 2018
2018 Luxembourg general election 14 October 2018
2018 Bavarian state election 14 October 2018
2018 Irish presidential election 26 October 2018
2018 Hessian state election 28 October 2018
2018 Georgian presidential election 28 October and 28 November 2018
2018 Donbass general elections 11 November 2018
2018 Andalusian regional election 2 December 2018
2018 Armenian parliamentary election 9 December 2018

North America
2018 Trinidad and Tobago presidential election 19 January 2018
2018 Costa Rican general election 4 February and 1 April 2018
2018 Sint Maarten general election 26 February 2018
2018 Salvadoran legislative election 4 March 2018
2018 Cuban parliamentary election 11 March 2018
2018 Grenadian general election 13 March 2018
2018 Barbadian general election 24 May 2018
Canadian electoral calendar, 2018
2018 Ontario general election 7 June 2018
2018 New Brunswick general election 24 September 2018
2018 Quebec general election 1 October 2018
2018 Mexican general election 1 July 2018
2018 United States elections 6 November 2018

South America
2018 French Guiana's 2nd constituency by-election 4 March and 11 March 2018
2018 Colombian parliamentary election 11 March 2018
2018 Paraguayan general election 22 April 2018
2018 Venezuelan presidential election 20 May 2018
2018 Colombian presidential election 27 May and 17 June 2018
2018 Brazilian general election 7 and 28 October 2018

Oceania
Australia
2018 Tasmanian state election 3 March 2018
2018 South Australian state election 17 March 2018
2018 Victorian state election 24 November 2018
2018 Wallis and Futuna's 1st constituency by-election 15 April 2018
2018 French Polynesian legislative election 22 April and 6 May 2018
2018 Cook Islands general election 14 June 2018
2018 New Caledonian independence referendum 4 November 2018
Fijian parliamentary election, 2018 14 November 2018

See also
 List of next general elections

References

 
2018
Elections